This article lists the results and fixtures for the Uzbekistan women's national football team.

The Uzbekistan women's national football team was founded in 1995.

AFC Women's Asian Cup

AFC Women's Asian Cup Qualification

Olympic Games Qualification

CAFA Championship

Turkish Women's Cup 

Exclude the match with  CSKA Moscow in 2021 Turkish Women's Cup.

Yongchuan International Tournament 

Denmark probably not national team.

Friendly 

 Tri-Nations Tournament in Uzbekistan April 2021: Uzbekistan, Belarus, India
 Tri-Nations Tournament in Belarus June 2021: Uzbekistan, Belarus, Iran

1995

2021

2022

See also 
 Uzbekistan women's national football team
 List of Uzbekistan women's international footballers
 Uzbekistan women's national under-20 football team
 Uzbekistan women's national under-17 football team

References

External link 
 Uzbekistan Football Association 

Women's national association football team results